Indianapolis, colloquially known as Indy, is the capital and most populous city of the U.S. state of Indiana and the seat of Marion County. According to the U.S. Census Bureau, the consolidated population of Indianapolis and Marion County was 977,203 in 2020. The "balance" population, which excludes semi-autonomous municipalities in Marion County, was 887,642. It is the 15th most populous city in the U.S., the third-most populous city in the Midwest, after Chicago and Columbus, Ohio, and the fourth-most populous state capital after Phoenix, Arizona, Austin, Texas, and Columbus. The Indianapolis metropolitan area is the 33rd most populous metropolitan statistical area in the U.S., with 2,111,040 residents. Its combined statistical area ranks 28th, with a population of 2,431,361.

Indigenous peoples inhabited the area dating to as early as 10,000 BC. In 1818, the Lenape relinquished their tribal lands in the Treaty of St. Mary's. In 1821, Indianapolis was founded as a planned city for the new seat of Indiana's state government. The city was platted by Alexander Ralston and Elias Pym Fordham on a  grid next to the White River. Completion of the National and Michigan roads and arrival of rail later solidified the city's position as a manufacturing and transportation hub. Two of the city's nicknames reflect its historical ties to transportation—the "Crossroads of America" and "Railroad City". Since the 1970 city-county consolidation, known as Unigov, local government administration operates under the direction of an elected 25-member city-county council headed by the mayor.

Indianapolis anchors the 29th largest economic region in the U.S., based primarily on the industries of trade, transportation, and utilities; professional and business services; education and health services; government; leisure and hospitality; and manufacturing. The city has notable niche markets in amateur sports and auto racing. The city is home to three Fortune 500 companies, two major league sports clubs (Colts and Pacers), five university campuses, and several museums, including the world's largest children's museum. However, the city is perhaps best known for annually hosting the world's largest single-day sporting event, the Indianapolis 500. Among the city's historic sites and districts, Indianapolis is home to the largest collection of monuments dedicated to veterans and war casualties in the U.S. outside of Washington, D.C.

Etymology
Jeremiah Sullivan, justice of the Indiana Supreme Court, is credited with coining the name. Other names considered were Concord, Suwarrow, and Tecumseh.

History

Founding

In 1816, the year Indiana gained statehood, the U.S. Congress donated four sections of federal land to establish a permanent seat of state government. Two years later, under the Treaty of St. Mary's (1818), the Delaware relinquished title to their tribal lands in central Indiana, agreeing to leave the area by 1821. This tract of land, which was called the New Purchase, included the site selected for the new state capital in 1820. The indigenous people of the land prior to systematic removal are the Miami Nation of Indiana (Miami Nation of Oklahoma) and Indianapolis makes up part of Cession 99; the primary treaty between the indigenous population and the United States was the Treaty of St. Mary's (1818).

The availability of new federal lands for purchase in central Indiana attracted settlers, many of them descendants of families from northwestern Europe. Although many of these first European and American settlers were Protestants, a large proportion of the early Irish and German immigrants were Catholics. Few African Americans lived in central Indiana before 1840. The first European Americans to permanently settle in the area that became Indianapolis were either the McCormick or Pogue families. The McCormicks are generally considered to be the first permanent settlers; however, some historians believe George Pogue and family may have arrived first, on March 2, 1819, and settled in a log cabin along the creek that was later called Pogue's Run. Other historians have argued as early as 1822 that John Wesley McCormick, his family, and employees became the area's first European American settlers, settling near the White River in February 1820.

On January 11, 1820, the Indiana General Assembly authorized a committee to select a site in central Indiana for the new state capital. The state legislature approved the site, adopting the name Indianapolis on January 6, 1821. In April, Alexander Ralston and Elias Pym Fordham were appointed to survey and design a town plan for the new settlement. Indianapolis became a seat of county government on December 31, 1821, when Marion County, was established. A combined county and town government continued until 1832 when Indianapolis was incorporated as a town. Indianapolis became an incorporated city effective March 30, 1847. Samuel Henderson, the city's first mayor, led the new city government, which included a seven-member city council. In 1853, voters approved a new city charter that provided for an elected mayor and a fourteen-member city council. The city charter continued to be revised as Indianapolis expanded. Effective January 1, 1825, the seat of state government moved to Indianapolis from Corydon, Indiana. In addition to state government offices, a U.S. district court was established at Indianapolis in 1825.

Growth occurred with the opening of the National Road through the town in 1827, the first major federally funded highway in the United States. A small segment of the ultimately failed Indiana Central Canal was opened in 1839. The first railroad to serve Indianapolis, the Jeffersonville, Madison and Indianapolis Railroad, began operation in 1847, and subsequent railroad connections fostered growth. Indianapolis Union Station was the first of its kind in the world when it opened in 1853.

Civil War and Gilded Age

During the American Civil War, Indianapolis was mostly loyal to the Union cause. Governor Oliver P. Morton, a major supporter of President Abraham Lincoln, quickly made Indianapolis a rallying place for Union army troops. On February 11, 1861, President-elect Lincoln arrived in the city, en route to Washington, D.C. for his presidential inauguration, marking the first visit from a president-elect in the city's history. On April 16, 1861, the first orders were issued to form Indiana's first regiments and establish Indianapolis as a headquarters for the state's volunteer soldiers. Within a week, more than 12,000 recruits signed up to fight for the Union.

Indianapolis became a major logistics hub during the war, establishing the city as a crucial military base. Between 1860 and 1870, the city's population more than doubled. An estimated 4,000 men from Indianapolis served in 39 regiments, and an estimated 700 died during the war. On May 20, 1863, Union soldiers attempted to disrupt a statewide Democratic convention at Indianapolis, forcing the proceedings to be adjourned, sarcastically referred to as the Battle of Pogue's Run. Fear turned to panic in July 1863, during Morgan's Raid into southern Indiana, but Confederate forces turned east toward Ohio, never reaching Indianapolis. On April 30, 1865, Lincoln's funeral train made a stop at Indianapolis, where an estimated crowd of more than 100,000 people passed the assassinated president's bier at the Indiana Statehouse.

Following the Civil War—and in the wake of the Second Industrial Revolution—Indianapolis experienced tremendous growth and prosperity. In 1880, Indianapolis was the world's third-largest pork packing city, after Chicago and Cincinnati, and the second-largest railroad center in the United States by 1888. By 1890, the city's population surpassed 100,000. Some of the city's most notable businesses were founded during this period of growth and innovation, including L. S. Ayres (1872), Eli Lilly and Company (1876), Madam C. J. Walker Manufacturing Company (1910), and Allison Transmission (1915). Once home to 60 automakers, Indianapolis rivaled Detroit as a center of automobile manufacturing. The city was an early focus of labor organization. The Indianapolis Street Car Strike of 1913 and subsequent police mutiny and riots led to the creation of the state's earliest labor-protection laws, including a minimum wage, regular work weeks, and improved working conditions. The International Typographical Union and United Mine Workers of America were among several influential labor unions based in the city.

Progressive Era to Great Depression

Some of the city's most prominent architectural features and best-known historical events date from the turn of the 20th century. The Soldiers' and Sailors' Monument, dedicated on May 15, 1902, would later become the city's unofficial symbol. Ray Harroun won the inaugural running of the Indianapolis 500, held May 30, 1911, at Indianapolis Motor Speedway. Indianapolis was one of the hardest hit cities in the Great Flood of 1913, resulting in five known deaths and the displacement of 7,000 families.

As a stop on the Underground Railroad, Indianapolis had one of the largest black populations in the Northern States, until the Great Migration. Led by D. C. Stephenson, the Indiana Klan became the most powerful political and social organization in Indianapolis from 1921 through 1928, controlling the City Council and the Board of School Commissioners, among others. At its height, more than 40% of native-born white males in Indianapolis claimed membership in the Klan.

Post–World War II
While campaigning in the city in 1968, Robert F. Kennedy delivered one of the most lauded speeches in 20th century American history, following the assassination of civil rights leader Martin Luther King Jr. As in most U.S. cities during the Civil Rights Movement, the city experienced strained race relations. A 1971 federal court decision forcing Indianapolis Public Schools to implement desegregation busing proved controversial.

During the administration of mayor Richard Lugar (1968–1976), the city and county governments were consolidated. Known as Unigov (a portmanteau of "unified" and "government"), the city-county consolidation removed bureaucratic redundancies, captured increasingly suburbanizing tax revenue, and created a Republican political machine that dominated local politics until the early 2000s. It was the first major city-county consolidation to occur in the U.S. without a referendum since the creation of the City of Greater New York in 1898.

Amid the changes in government and growth, the city pursued an aggressive economic development strategy to brand Indianapolis as a sports tourism destination, known as the Indianapolis Project. During the administration of the city's longest-serving mayor, William Hudnut, (1976–1992), millions of dollars were invested into sports facilities and public relations campaigns. The strategy was successful in landing the U.S. Olympic Festival in 1982, securing the relocation of the Baltimore Colts in 1984, and hosting the 1987 Pan American Games.

1990s to present
Economic development initiatives focused on revitalizing the city's downtown continued in the 1990s under the mayoral administration of Stephen Goldsmith. During this period, a number of cultural amenities were completed at White River State Park, the Canal Walk continued development, Circle Centre Mall was completed, and new sports venues (Victory Field and Gainbridge Fieldhouse) were opened. In 1999, several cultural districts were designated to capitalize on cultural assets within historically significant neighborhoods unique to the city's heritage as a means to promote continued economic development.

During the 2000s, the city invested heavily in public infrastructure projects, including two of the largest building projects in the city's history: the $1.1 billion Indianapolis International Airport Colonel H. Weir Cook Terminal and $720 million Lucas Oil Stadium, both opened in 2008. A $275 million expansion of the Indiana Convention Center was completed in 2011. Construction began that year on DigIndy, a $1.9 billion project to correct the city's combined sewer overflows by 2025. Rapid transit was reintroduced to Indianapolis with the opening of IndyGo's $96 million Red Line bus rapid transit project in 2019.

Geography

It is the 18th largest city by land area in the U.S.

As a consolidated city-county, the city's municipal boundaries are coterminous with Marion County, except the autonomous and semi-autonomous municipalities outlined in Unigov. Nine civil townships form the broadest geographic divisions within the city and county. The consolidated city-county borders the adjacent counties of Boone to the northwest; Hamilton to the north; Hancock to the east; Shelby to the southeast; Johnson to the south; Morgan to the southwest; and Hendricks to the west.

Indianapolis is located within a physiographic province known as the Tipton Till Plain, a flat, gently rolling terrain underlain by glacial deposits known as till. The city lies just north of the Indiana Uplands, a region characterized by rolling hills and high limestone content.

Indianapolis is located in the West Fork White River drainage basin, part of the larger Mississippi River watershed via the Wabash and Ohio rivers. The city's largest water bodies are artificial quarry lakes or reservoirs.

Flora and fauna

Indianapolis is situated in the Southern Great Lakes forests ecoregion which in turn is located within the larger temperate broadleaf and mixed forests biome, as defined by the World Wide Fund for Nature. Based on the United States Environmental Protection Agency's alternative classification system, the city is located in the Eastern Corn Belt Plains, an area of the U.S. known for its fertile agricultural land.

Much of the decidious forests that once covered 98% of the region were cleared for agriculture and urban development, contributing to considerable habitat loss. Indianapolis's current urban tree canopy averages approximately 33%. The cemetery's  represents the largest green space in Center Township, home to an abundance of wildlife and some 130 species of trees. Native trees most common to the area include varieties of ash, maple, and oak. Several invasive species are also common in Indianapolis, including tree of heaven, wintercreeper, Amur honeysuckle, and Callery or Bradford pear.

A 2016 bioblitz along three of the city's riparian corridors found 590 taxa. Urban wildlife common to the Indianapolis area include mammals such as the white-tailed deer, eastern chipmunk, eastern cottontail, and the eastern grey and American red squirrels. In recent years, local raccoon and groundhog populations have increased alongside sightings of American badgers, beavers, mink, coyotes, and red fox. Birds native to the area include the northern cardinal, wood thrush, eastern screech owl, mourning dove, pileated and red-bellied woodpeckers, and wild turkey. Located in the Mississippi Flyway, the city sees more than 400 migratory bird species throughout the year. Some 57 species of fish can be found in the city's waterways, including bass and sunfish. Some federally-designated endangered and threatened species are native to the Indianapolis area, including several species of freshwater mussels, the rusty patched bumble bee, Indiana bat, northern long-eared bat, and the running buffalo clover.

In recent years, the National Wildlife Federation has ranked Indianapolis among the ten most wildlife-friendly cities in the U.S.

Climate

Indianapolis has a hot-summer humid continental climate (Köppen climate classification Dfa), but can be considered a borderline humid subtropical climate (Köppen: Cfa) using the  isotherm. It experiences four distinct seasons. The city lies at the transition between USDA plant hardiness zones 5b and 6a.

Typically, summers are hot, humid, and wet. Winters are generally cold with moderate snowfall. High temperatures reach or exceed  an average of 18 days each year, and occasionally exceed . Spring and autumn are usually pleasant, if at times unpredictable; midday temperature drops exceeding  are common during March and April, and instances of very warm days followed within 36 hours by snowfall are not unusual during these months.

The rainiest months occur in the spring and summer, with slightly higher averages during May, June, and July. Most rain is derived from thunderstorm activity; there is no distinct dry season, although occasional droughts occur. Severe weather is not uncommon, particularly in the spring and summer months; the city experiences an average of 20 thunderstorm days annually.

Cityscape

Indianapolis is a planned city. On January 11, 1820, the Indiana General Assembly authorized a committee to select a site in central Indiana for the new state capital, appointing Alexander Ralston and Elias Pym Fordham to survey and design a town plan for Indianapolis.

The plan, known as the Mile Square, is bounded by East, West, North, and South streets, centered on a traffic circle, called Monument Circle (originally Circle Street), from which Indianapolis's "Circle City" nickname originated. Four diagonal streets radiated a block from Monument Circle: Massachusetts, Virginia, Kentucky, and Indiana avenues. The city's address numbering system begins at the intersection of Washington and Meridian streets. Before its submersion into a sanitary tunnel, Pogue's Run was included into the plan, disrupting the rectilinear street grid to the southeast.

Compared with similar-sized American cities, Indianapolis is unique in that it contains some 200 farms covering thousands of acres of agricultural land within its municipal boundaries. Equestrian farms and corn and soybean fields interspersed with suburban development are commonplace on the city's periphery, especially in Franklin Township.

Architecture

Noted as one of the finest examples of the City Beautiful movement design in the U.S., the Indiana World War Memorial Plaza Historic District began construction in 1921 in downtown Indianapolis. The district, a National Historic Landmark, encompasses several examples of neoclassical architecture, including the American Legion, Central Library, and Birch Bayh Federal Building and United States Courthouse. The district is also home to several sculptures and memorials, Depew Memorial Fountain, and open space, hosting many annual civic events.

A building boom, lasting from 1982 to 1990, saw the construction of six of the city's ten tallest buildings. Indiana limestone is the signature building material in Indianapolis, widely included in the city's many monuments, churches, academic, government, and civic buildings.

Neighborhoods

For statistical purposes, the consolidated city-county is organized into 99 "neighborhood areas" with most containing numerous individual historic and cultural districts, subdivisions, and some semi-autonomous towns. In total, some 500 self-identified neighborhood associations are listed in the city's Registered Community Organization system. As a result of the city's expansive land area, Indianapolis has a unique urban-to-rural transect, ranging from dense urban neighborhoods to suburban tract housing subdivisions, to rural villages.

Typical of American cities in the Midwest, Indianapolis urbanized in the late-19th and early-20th centuries, resulting in the development of relatively dense, well-defined neighborhoods clustered around streetcar corridors, especially in Center Township. Notable streetcar suburbs include Broad Ripple, Irvington, and University Heights. Starting in the mid-20th century, the post–World War II economic expansion and subsequent suburbanization greatly influenced the city's development patterns. From 1950 to 1970, nearly 100,000 housing units were built in Marion County, most outside Center Township in suburban neighborhoods such as Castleton, Eagledale, and Nora.

Since the 2000s, downtown Indianapolis and surrounding neighborhoods have seen increased reinvestment mirroring nationwide market trends, driven by empty nesters and millennials. Renewed interest in urban living has been met with some dispute regarding gentrification and affordable housing. According to a Center for Community Progress report, neighborhoods like Cottage Home and Fall Creek Place have experienced measurable gentrification since 2000. The North Meridian Street Historic District is among the most affluent urban neighborhoods in the U.S., with a mean household income of $102,599 in 2017.

Parkland

Indianapolis maintains 212 public parks covering  of green space, representing about 5.1% of the city's land area. Amenities include 129 playgrounds, 155 sports fields,  of recreational trails, 23 recreation and nature centers, 21 spraygrounds, 19 aquatic centers, 13 golf courses, and four dog parks. The department also provides 2,400 programs and classes annually. Eagle Creek Park is the largest and most visited park in the city and ranks among the largest municipal parks in the U.S., covering .

Military Park was established as the city's first state-owned park in 1852. Garfield Park was the city's first municipally-owned park, opening in 1876 as Southern Park. In the early-20th century, the city enlisted landscape architect George Kessler to conceive a framework for Indianapolis's modern parks system. Kessler's 1909 Indianapolis Park and Boulevard Plan linked notable parks, such as Brookside, Ellenberger, Garfield, and Riverside parks, with a system of parkways following the city's waterways. The system's  were added to the National Register of Historic Places in 2003.

Marion County is home to two Indiana state parks: Fort Harrison State Park in Lawrence and White River State Park in downtown Indianapolis. Established in 1996, Fort Harrison State Park covers  under the management of the Indiana Department of Natural Resources. White River is owned and operated by the White River State Park Development Commission, a quasi-governmental agency. Encompassing , White River is the city's major urban park, home to the Indianapolis Zoo, White River Gardens, and museums. Two land trusts are active in the city managing several sites for nature conservation throughout the region.

Demographics

The U.S. Census Bureau considers Indianapolis as two entities: the consolidated city and the city's remainder, or balance. The consolidated city is coterminous with Marion County, except the independent municipalities of Beech Grove, Lawrence, Southport, and Speedway. The city's balance excludes the populations of ten semi-autonomous municipalities that are included in totals for the consolidated city. These are Clermont, Crows Nest, Homecroft, Meridian Hills, North Crows Nest, Rocky Ripple, Spring Hill, Warren Park, Williams Creek, and Wynnedale. An eleventh town, Cumberland, is partially included. In 2018 estimates, the city's consolidated population was 876,862 and its balance was 867,125. Indianapolis is the most populous city in Indiana, containing nearly 13% of the state's total population.

The Indianapolis metropolitan area, officially the Indianapolis–Carmel–Anderson metropolitan statistical area (MSA), consists of Marion County and the surrounding counties of Boone, Brown, Hamilton, Hancock, Hendricks, Johnson, Madison, Morgan, Putnam, and Shelby. In 2018, the metropolitan area's population was 2,048,703, the most populous in Indiana and home to 30% of the state's residents. With a population of 2,431,361, the larger Indianapolis–Carmel–Muncie combined statistical area (CSA) covers 18 counties, home to 36% of Indiana residents. Indianapolis is also situated within the Great Lakes Megalopolis, the largest of 11 megaregions in the U.S.

According to the U.S. Census of 2010, 97.2% of the Indianapolis population was reported as one race: 61.8% White, 27.5% Black or African American, 2.1% Asian (0.4% Burmese, 0.4% Indian, 0.3% Chinese, 0.3% Filipino, 0.1% Korean, 0.1% Vietnamese, 0.1% Japanese, 0.1% Thai, 0.1% other Asian); 0.3% American Indian, and 5.5% as other. The remaining 2.8% of the population was reported as multiracial (two or more races). The city's Hispanic or Latino community constituted 9.4% of the city's population in the 2010 U.S. Census: 6.9% Mexican, 0.4% Puerto Rican, 0.1% Cuban, and 2% as other.

In 2010, the median age for Indianapolis was 33.7 years. Age distribution for the city's inhabitants was 25% under the age of 18; 4.4% were between 18 and 21; 16.3% were age 21 to 65; and 13.1% were age 65 or older. For every 100 females, there were 93 males. For every 100 females age 18 and over, there were 90 males.

The 2010 census reported 332,199 households in Indianapolis, with an average household size of 2.42 and an average family size of 3.08. Of the total households, 59.3% were family households, with 28.2% of these including the family's own children under the age of 18; 36.5% were husband-wife families; 17.2% had a female householder (with no husband present) and 5.6% had a male householder (with no wife present). The remaining 40.7% were non-family households. , 32% of the non-family households included individuals living alone, 8.3% of these households included individuals age 65 years of age or older.

The U.S. Census Bureau's 2007–2011 American Community Survey indicated the median household income for Indianapolis city was $42,704, and the median family income was $53,161. Median income for males working full-time, year-round, was $42,101, compared to $34,788 for females. Per capita income for the city was $24,430, 14.7% of families and 18.9% of the city's total population living below the poverty line (28.3% were under the age of 18 and 9.2% were age 65 or older).

Based on 2015 estimates, the Indianapolis metropolitan area had the 18th highest percentage of LGBT residents in the U.S., with 4.2% of residents identifying as gay, lesbian, bisexual, or transgender.

In 2015, Brookings characterized the Indianapolis metropolitan area as a minor-emerging immigrant gateway with a foreign-born population of 126,767, or 6.4% of the total population, a 131% increase from 2000. Much of this growth can be attributed to thousands of Burmese-Chin refugees who have settled in Indianapolis, particularly Perry Township, since the late-1990s. Indianapolis is home to one of the largest concentrations of Chin people outside of Myanmar (formerly Burma), with an estimated population ranging from 17,000 to 24,000.

Religion

Of the 42.42% of the city's residents who identify as religious, Roman Catholics make up the largest group, at 11.31%. The second highest religious group in the city are Baptists at 10.31%, with Methodists following behind at 4.97%. Presbyterians make up 2.13% of the city's religiously affiliated population, followed by Pentecostals and Lutherans. Another 8.57% are affiliated with other Christian faiths. 0.32% of religiously affiliated persons identified themselves as following Eastern religions, while 0.68% of the religiously affiliated population identified as Jewish, and 0.29% as Muslim. According to the nonpartisan and nonprofit Public Religion Research Institute's American Values Atlas, 22% of residents identify as religiously "unaffiliated," consistent with the national average of 22.7%.

SS. Peter and Paul Cathedral is the seat of the Roman Catholic Archdiocese of Indianapolis. Bishop Simon Bruté College Seminary and Marian University are affiliated with the archdiocese. Christian Theological Seminary is another seminary located in the city, affiliated with the Christian Church (Disciples of Christ). Christ Church Cathedral, the city's oldest house of worship, is pro-cathedral of the Episcopal Diocese of Indianapolis. The Indiana-Kentucky Synod of the Evangelical Lutheran Church in America is also based in Indianapolis. Religious denominations headquartered in the city include the Free Methodist Church and Lutheran Ministerium and Synod – USA.

Economy

According to the U.S. Bureau of Labor Statistics, the largest industries by employment in the Indianapolis metropolitan area are trade, transportation, and utilities; professional and business services; education and health services; government; leisure and hospitality; and manufacturing, respectively. The region's unemployment rate was 1.2 percent in December 2021. The city's major exports include pharmaceuticals, motor vehicle parts, medical equipment and supplies, engine and power equipment, and aircraft products and parts.

According to the Federal Reserve Bank of St. Louis, the gross domestic product (GDP) of the Indianapolis metropolitan area was $147 billion.

Three Fortune 500 companies are based in the city: health insurance company Elevance Health; pharmaceutical company Eli Lilly and Company; and agricultural chemical company Corteva. Other companies based in the city include Allison Transmission, Barnes & Thornburg, Calumet Specialty Products Partners, Emmis Communications, Finish Line, Inc., Herff Jones, Klipsch Audio Technologies, Lids, OneAmerica Financial Partners, Inc., Republic Airways Holdings, Simon Property Group, and Steak 'n Shake.

Distribution and logistics

Indianapolis' central location and extensive highway and rail infrastructure have positioned the city as an important logistics center. According to the Indy Chamber, the region was home to some 4,300 establishments employing nearly 110,000 in 2020.

Amazon has a major presence in the Indianapolis metropolitan area, employing 9,000. Indianapolis is home to FedEx Express's National Hub which employs 7,000 workers in sorting, distribution, and shipping at Indianapolis International Airport. Other logistics companies in the region with large workforces include Ingram Micro (1,300) and Venture Logistics (1,150).

Life sciences and health

Indianapolis anchors one of the largest life sciences clusters in the U.S., notably in the subsectors of drugs and pharmaceuticals and agricultural feedstock and chemicals. Life sciences employ between 21,200 and 28,700 among nearly 350 companies located in the region. Pharmaceutical company Eli Lilly is the city's largest private employer, with a workforce of 11,000 in research and development, manufacturing, and executive administration. Other major employers include Corteva (1,500), Labcorp Drug Development (1,500), and Roche's North American headquarters (4,500).

Indianapolis is also a hub for academic medicine and health sciences research, home to such institutions as the Indiana Biosciences Research Institute, Indiana University School of Medicine, School of Nursing, and School of Dentistry; Marian University College of Osteopathic Medicine; and the American College of Sports Medicine. The regional healthcare providers of Community Health Network, Eskenazi Health, Franciscan Health, Indiana University Health, and St. Vincent Health have a combined workforce of 43,700.

According to a 2021 report commissioned by BioCrossroads, Central Indiana's life sciences and healthcare sector generates nearly $84 billion in total economic output and supports more than 331,000 jobs throughout the region.

Manufacturing
Historically, manufacturing has been a critical component of Indianapolis' economic landscape; however, deindustrialization since the mid-20th century has significantly impacted the city's workforce. Indianapolis is typically considered part of the Rust Belt, a region of the Northeastern and Midwestern U.S. beleaguered by industrial and population decline. Between 1990 and 2012, approximately 26,900 manufacturing jobs were lost in the city as it continued diversification efforts and transitioned to a service economy. RCA and Western Electric formerly employed thousands at their Indianapolis manufacturing plants.

Once home to 60 automakers, Indianapolis rivaled Detroit as a center of automobile manufacturing and design in the early 20th century. Indianapolis was home to several luxury car companies, including Duesenberg, Marmon, and Stutz Motor Company; however, the automakers did not survive the Great Depression of the 1930s. Detroit's Big Three automakers maintained a presence in the city and continued to operate in various capacities until the 2000s: Ford Motor Company (1914–1942, 1956–2008), Chrysler (1925–2005), and General Motors (1930–2011).

Indianapolis is home to Allison Transmission's headquarters and manufacturing facilities, employing 2,500 in the design and production of automatic transmissions and hybrid propulsion systems. Rolls-Royce North America dates its local presence to the establishment of the Allison Engine Company in 1915. Its Indianapolis Operations Center has a workforce of 4,000 in aircraft engine development and manufacturing. Other major manufacturing employers include Allegion (1,300) and Raytheon Technologies (1,000). In 2016, Carrier Corporation announced the closure of its Indianapolis plant, moving 1,400 manufacturing jobs to Mexico. Carrier later negotiated with the incoming Trump administration to save some jobs. The company's local workforce numbers 800 in gas furnace production.

Hospitality

The hospitality industry is an increasingly vital sector of the Indianapolis economy. According to Visit Indy, 29.2 million visitors generate $5.6 billion annually, supporting 82,900 jobs. Indianapolis has long been a sports tourism destination but has more recently relied on conventions. From 2010 to 2019, average annual attendance for conventions was 494,000, an increase of 26% from the previous decade.

The Indiana Convention Center (ICC) and Lucas Oil Stadium are considered mega convention center facilities, with a combined  of exhibition space. ICC is connected to 12 hotels and 4,700 hotel rooms, the most of any U.S. convention center. Resident conventions annually hosted in the city include FDIC International, National FFA Organization Convention, Gen Con, and Performance Racing Industry (PRI) Trade Show.

Technology
Indianapolis ranks among the fastest high-tech job growth areas in the U.S. The metropolitan area is home to 28,500 information technology-related jobs at such companies as Angi, Formstack, Genesys, Hubstaff, Infosys, Ingram Micro, and Salesforce Marketing Cloud. Salesforce has the largest workforce of local tech firms, employing about 2,100 in Indianapolis.

Culture

Visual arts

The city's primary art museum is the Indianapolis Museum of Art, founded in 1883 by suffragist May Wright Sewall. The museum's holdings demonstrate the institution's emphasis on the connections among art, design, and the natural environment.

Established under the Works Progress Administration in 1934, the Indianapolis Art Center is a not-for-profit arts organization located in the city's Broad Ripple neighborhood. Its Michael Graves-designed building houses the Marilyn K. Glick School of Art, galleries, a library, and an auditorium. Sited along the White River, the center's  includes a public sculpture garden. The center hosts hundreds of classes, dozens of exhibitions, several outreach programs, and multiple art fairs and events throughout the year.

Founded by local businessman and philanthropist Harrison Eiteljorg, the Eiteljorg Museum of American Indians and Western Art opened at White River State Park in 1989. In addition to its diverse collection of visual arts by indigenous peoples of the Americas and American Western art, the museum hosts numerous lectures, artist residencies, special exhibitions, and events annually.

Located on the IUPUI campus, the Herron School of Art and Design was established in 1902 as the John Herron Art Institute. The school's first core faculty included Impressionist painters of the Hoosier Group: T. C. Steele, J. Ottis Adams, William Forsyth, Richard Gruelle, and Otto Stark. The university's public art collection is extensive, with more than 30 works. Other public works can be found in the Eskenazi Health Art Collection and the Indiana Statehouse Public Art Collection.

Performing arts

Downtown Indianapolis is home to several of the city's earliest performing arts venues and organizations. Opened in 1916, the Hilbert Circle Theatre is home to the Indianapolis Symphony Orchestra, which performs nearly 200 concerts annually. The Indiana Theatre, which opened in 1927 on Washington Street, houses the Indiana Repertory Theatre, the state's largest non-profit professional repertory theatre. Founded in 1983, the nonprofit Phoenix Theatre focuses on contemporary theatrical productions. Other notable venues near the central business district include the Indianapolis Artsgarden and TCU Amphitheater at White River State Park, the city's largest outdoor venue.

Downtown's Mass Ave Cultural Arts District is home to Old National Centre at the Murat Shrine, the oldest stagehouse in Indianapolis, having opened in 1910. The center features a 2,500-seat performing arts theatre, 2,000-seat concert hall, and 900-seat multi-functional room, hosting approximately 400 public and private events throughout the year. Mass Ave is also home to The District Theatre and the Basile and Indy Eleven theaters. The 100-seat Basile Theatre and 70-seat black box Indy Eleven Theatre annually hosts the Indianapolis Theatre Fringe Festival, or "IndyFringe".

In 1927, Madam Walker Legacy Center opened in the heart of the city's African-American neighborhood on Indiana Avenue. The theater is named for Madam C. J. Walker, an African American entrepreneur, philanthropist, and activist who began her beauty empire in Indianapolis. The theater hosted vaudeville shows and anchored the Indiana Avenue jazz scene from the 1920s through the 1960s. "The Avenue" produced greats such as David Baker, Slide Hampton, Freddie Hubbard, J. J. Johnson, James Spaulding, and the Montgomery Brothers (Buddy, Monk, and Wes). Wes Montgomery is considered one of the most influential jazz guitarists of all time, and is credited with popularizing the "Naptown Sound."

Other performing arts organizations in the city include The Cabaret, Indianapolis Baroque Orchestra, Indianapolis Chamber Orchestra, Indianapolis Opera, and Indianapolis Youth Orchestra. The city's Broad Ripple and Fountain Square neighborhoods are known for local live music, home to dozens of venues. Other notable venues include Butler University's Clowes Memorial Hall, Melody Inn in Butler-Tarkington, and The Emerson Theater in Little Flower.

Indianapolis is home to a variety of national professional musical organizations, including the American Pianists Association, Bands of America, Drum Corps International, and the Percussive Arts Society. Annual music festivals and competitions held in the city include the Drum Corps International World Class Championships, Indianapolis Early Music Festival, and Indy Jazz Fest. The quadrennial International Violin Competition of Indianapolis is considered among the most prestigious of its kind in the world.

Literature

Indianapolis was at the center of the Golden Age of Indiana Literature from 1870 to 1920. Several notable poets and writers based in the city achieved national prominence and critical acclaim during this period, including James Whitcomb Riley, Booth Tarkington, and Meredith Nicholson. In A History of Indiana Literature, Arthur W. Shumaker remarked on the era's influence: "It was the age of famous men and their famous books. In it Indiana, and particularly Indianapolis, became a literary center which in many ways rivaled the East." A 1947 study found that Indiana authors ranked second to New York in the number of bestsellers produced in the previous 40 years. Located in Lockerbie Square, the James Whitcomb Riley Museum Home has been a National Historic Landmark since 1962.

Perhaps the city's most acclaimed twentieth-century writer was Kurt Vonnegut, known for his darkly satirical and controversial bestselling novel Slaughterhouse-Five. The Kurt Vonnegut Museum and Library opened in 2010 downtown. Vonnegut became known for including at least one character in his novels from Indianapolis. Upon returning to the city in 1986, Vonnegut acknowledged the influence the city had on his writings:

A key figure of the Black Arts Movement, Indianapolis resident Mari Evans was among the most influential of the twentieth century's black poets. Indianapolis is home to bestselling young adult fiction writer John Green, known for his critically acclaimed 2012 novel The Fault in Our Stars, set in the city.

Attractions

The Children's Museum of Indianapolis is the largest of its kind in the world, offering  of exhibit space. The museum holds a collection of over 120,000 artifacts, including the Broad Ripple Park Carousel, a National Historic Landmark. Because of its leadership and innovations, the museum is a world leader in its field. Child and Parents magazine have both ranked the museum as the best children's museum in the U.S. The museum is one of the city's most popular attractions, with nearly 1.3 million visitors in 2019.

The Indianapolis Zoo houses more than 1,400 animals of 235 species while the adjoining White River Gardens contains more than 50,000 plants of nearly 3,000 species, respectively. The zoo is a leader in animal conservation and research, recognized for its biennial Indianapolis Prize award. It is the only American zoo accredited as a zoo, aquarium, and zoological garden by the Association of Zoos and Aquariums. It is among the largest privately funded zoos in the U.S. and one of the city's most visited attractions, with 1.1 million guests in 2019.

The Indianapolis Motor Speedway Museum exhibits an extensive collection of auto racing memorabilia showcasing various motorsports and automotive history. Daily grounds and track tours originate from the museum. Located at the National Collegiate Athletic Association headquarters, the NCAA Hall of Champions exhibits collegiate athletics in the U.S.

Indianapolis is home to several centers commemorating Indiana's history. These include the Indiana Historical Society, Indiana State Library and Historical Bureau, Indiana State Museum, and Indiana Medical History Museum. Indiana Landmarks, the largest nonprofit statewide historic preservation organization in the U.S., is also based in the city. The Benjamin Harrison Presidential Site, in the Old Northside Historic District, is open for daily tours and includes archives and memorabilia from the 23rd President of the United States. Other notable graves include three U.S. Vice Presidents and notorious American gangster, John Dillinger.

Two museums and several memorials in the city commemorate armed forces or conflict, including the Colonel Eli Lilly Civil War Museum and Indiana World War Memorial Military Museum at the Indiana World War Memorial Plaza. Outside of Washington, D.C., Indianapolis contains the largest collection of monuments dedicated to veterans and war casualties in the nation. Other notable sites are the Crown Hill National Cemetery, Indiana 9/11 Memorial, Medal of Honor Memorial, Soldiers' and Sailors' Monument, and the USS Indianapolis National Memorial.

Beginning construction in 1836, the Indiana Central Canal is the oldest existing artificial facility in the city, recognized as an American Water Landmark since 1971. This section, known as the Canal Walk, is flanked by walking and bicycling paths and offers gondola rides, pedal boats, kayaks, and surrey rentals.

Indianapolis is home to dozens of annual festivals and events showcasing local culture. The "Month of May" (a series of celebrations leading to the Indianapolis 500) is perhaps the largest annual celebration in the city, with the 500 Festival Parade regularly drawing 300,000 spectators. Other notable events include Indiana Black Expo, Indiana State Fair, Indy Pride Festival, and Historic Irvington Halloween Festival.

Cuisine

Indianapolis has an emerging food scene as well as established eateries. Founded in 1821 as the city's public market, the Indianapolis City Market has served the community from its current building since 1886. Prior to World War II, the City Market and neighboring Tomlinson Hall were home to meat and vegetable vendors. As consumer habits evolved and residents moved from the central city, City Market transitioned from a traditional marketplace to a food hall. In addition to City Market, The AMP and The Garage food halls opened in 2021.

Situated in the Corn Belt, Indianapolis has maintained close ties to farming and food production. Urban agriculture in the city dates to the 1930s, when non-profit organization Flanner House began teaching Black arrivals how to farm on vacant lots during the Great Migration. Urban agriculture has made a comeback in recent years in an effort to alleviate food deserts. According to the city's Office of Sustainability, there were 129 community farms and gardens in 2020. , several farmers' markets have been established throughout Indianapolis.

Distinctive local dishes include pork tenderloin sandwiches and sugar cream pie, the latter being the unofficial state pie of Indiana. The beef Manhattan, invented in Indianapolis, can also be found on restaurant menus throughout the city and region.

Opened in 1902, St. Elmo Steak House is well known for its signature shrimp cocktail, named by the Travel Channel as the "world's spiciest food". In 2012, it was recognized by the James Beard Foundation as one of "America's Classics". The Slippery Noodle Inn, a blues bar and restaurant, is the oldest continuously operating tavern in Indiana, having opened in 1850. The Jazz Kitchen, opened in 1994, was recognized in 2011 by OpenTable as one of the "top 50 late night dining hotspots" in the U.S.

In 2016, Condé Nast Traveler named Indianapolis the "most underrated food city in the U.S.," while ranking Milktooth as one of the best restaurants in the world. Food & Wine called Indianapolis the "rising star of the Midwest," recognizing Milktooth, Rook, Amelia's, and Bluebeard, all in Fletcher Place. Several Indianapolis chefs and restaurateurs have been semifinalists in the James Beard Foundation Awards in recent years. Microbreweries are quickly becoming a staple in the city, increasing fivefold since 2009. There are now about 50 craft brewers in Indianapolis, with Sun King Brewing being the largest.

For some time, Indianapolis was known as the "100 Percent American City" for its racial and ethnic homogeneity. Historically, these factors, as well as low taxes and wages, provided chain restaurants a relatively stable market to test dining preferences before expanding nationwide. As a result, the Indianapolis metropolitan area had the highest concentration of chain restaurants per capita of any market in the U.S. in 2008, with one chain restaurant for every 1,459 people—44% higher than the national average. In recent years, immigrants have opened some 800 ethnic restaurants.

Film and television

Indianapolis natives have left a mark on the entertainment industry, most notably during the Classical Hollywood cinema era. James Baskett received an Academy Honorary Award in 1948 for his role in Walt Disney's Song of the South, becoming the first Black male to receive an Oscar. Sid Grauman, one of the founders of the Academy of Motion Picture Arts and Sciences, received an Academy Honorary Award in 1949, recognized for raising the standard for film exhibition. Perhaps the most famous actor from the Indianapolis area is Academy Award-nominee, Steve McQueen, who was born in Beech Grove. Other Academy Award nominees from the city include costume designer Gloria Gresham, actress Marjorie Main, and actor Clifton Webb.

The city's storied sports venues have served as a backdrop for such films as Hoosiers (1986) and Eight Men Out (1988). The city's largest contribution to popular culture, the Indianapolis 500, has influenced entertainment for decades, referenced in film, television, video games, and other media. Three motion pictures filmed at the Indianapolis Motor Speedway include Speedway (1929), To Please a Lady (1950), and Winning (1969). Other motion pictures at least partially filmed in the city include Going All the Way (1997), Palindromes (2004), Saving Star Wars (2004), Amanda (2009), Walter (2015), The MisEducation of Bindu (2019), Athlete A (2020), and Our Father (2022). Hoosiers and Ringling Brothers Parade Film (1902) were added to the National Film Registry in 2001 and 2021, respectively.

Indianapolis natives Jane Pauley and David Letterman launched their Emmy Award-winning broadcasting careers in local media, Pauley with WISH-TV and Letterman with WTHR, respectively. Television programs that have shot on location in the city include American Ninja Warrior, Antiques Roadshow, Cops, Diners, Drive-Ins and Dives, Extreme Makeover: Home Edition, Gaycation, Ghost Hunters, Good Bones, Hard Knocks, Late Night with Jimmy Fallon, Man v. Food, Parks and Recreation, Say I Do, SportsCenter, Today, and What Would You Do?

Annual film festivals held in Indianapolis include the Circle City Film Festival, Heartland International Film Festival, Indianapolis International Film Festival, Indianapolis Jewish Film Festival, and Indianapolis LGBT Film Festival. Founded in 2018, the Indy Shorts International Film Festival is one of 34 film festivals in the world used to qualify for the Academy Awards.

Film Indy was established in 2016 to support local visual artists, filmmakers, and aspiring filmmakers; recruit film and television-related marketing opportunities to the region, and provide resources for producers interested in filming in the city. Since 2016, more than 350 film and media projects have been produced in the Indianapolis region with a collective economic impact of $24.1 million and the creation of 1,900 local jobs.

Sports

Professional

The Indianapolis Colts of the National Football League (NFL) have been based in the city since relocating from Baltimore in 1984. The Colts' tenure in Indianapolis has produced 11 division championships, two conference championships, and two Super Bowl appearances. Pro Football Hall of Famer Peyton Manning led the team to win Super Bowl XLI in the 2006 NFL season. Lucas Oil Stadium replaced the team's first home, the RCA Dome, in 2008.

Founded in 1967, the Indiana Pacers began in the American Basketball Association (ABA), joining the National Basketball Association (NBA) when the leagues merged in 1976. Before joining the NBA, the Pacers won three division titles and three championships (1970, 1972, 1973). Since the merger, the Pacers have won one conference title and six division titles, most recently in 2014. Founded in 2000, the Indiana Fever of the Women's National Basketball Association (WNBA) have won three conference titles and one championship in 2012. The Fever and Pacers share Gainbridge Fieldhouse, which replaced Market Square Arena in 1999.

The Indianapolis Indians of the International League are the second-oldest minor league franchise in American professional baseball, having been established in 1902. The Indians have won 26 division titles, 14 league titles, and seven championships, most recently in 2000. The team has played at Victory Field since 1996. 

Other local minor league franchises include the Indy Eleven soccer team of the USL Championship (USLC), who play their home matches at Michael A. Carroll Stadium, and the Indy Fuel hockey team of the ECHL, who play their home games at the Indiana Farmers Coliseum. Both teams premiered in 2014.

Amateur

Indianapolis has been called the "Amateur Sports Capital of the World". The National Collegiate Athletic Association (NCAA), the main governing body for U.S. collegiate sports, and the National Federation of State High School Associations are based in Indianapolis. The city is home to two NCAA athletic conferences: the Horizon League (D-I) and the Great Lakes Valley Conference (D-II). Indianapolis is also home to three national sport governing bodies, as recognized by the U.S. Olympic & Paralympic Committee: USA Football; USA Gymnastics; and USA Track & Field.

Butler University and IUPUI are D-I schools. The Butler Bulldogs compete in the Big East Conference while the IUPUI Jaguars compete in the Horizon League. The University of Indianapolis is a D-II school; the Greyhounds compete in the Great Lakes Valley Conference. Marian University athletics compete in the NAIA's Crossroads League.

Traditionally, Butler's Hinkle Fieldhouse was the hub for Hoosier Hysteria, a general excitement for the game of basketball throughout the state, specifically the Indiana High School Boys Basketball Tournament. Hinkle, a National Historic Landmark, opened in 1928 as the world's largest basketball arena, with seating for 15,000. It is regarded as "Indiana's Basketball Cathedral". Perhaps the most notable game was the 1954 state championship, which inspired the critically acclaimed film, Hoosiers.

Events
Indianapolis hosts numerous sporting events annually, including the OneAmerica 500 Festival Mini-Marathon (1977–present), Circle City Classic (1984–present), NFL Scouting Combine (1987–present), Monumental Marathon (2008–present), and Big Ten Football Championship Game (2011–present). Indianapolis is also a regular host of the NCAA Division I men's basketball tournament (1980, 1991, 1997, 2000, 2006, 2010, 2015, and 2021).

Notable past events include the National Sports Festival (1982); NBA All-Star Game (1985); Pan American Games X (1987); US Open Series Indianapolis Tennis Championships (1988–2009); World Artistic Gymnastics Championships (1991); WrestleMania VIII (1992); World Rowing Championships (1994); United States Grand Prix (2000–2007); World Police and Fire Games (2001); FIBA Basketball World Cup (2002); NCAA Division I women's basketball tournament (2005, 2011, and 2016); Super Bowl XLVI (2012); and the College Football Playoff National Championship (2022).

Motorsports

Indianapolis is a major center for motorsports. Two auto racing sanctioning bodies are headquartered in the city (INDYCAR and United States Auto Club) along with more than 500 motorsports companies and racing teams, employing some 10,000 people in the region. Indianapolis or Indy is a metonym for auto racing, used for both the competition and type of car used in it.

Completed in 1909 as an automotive test track, the Indianapolis Motor Speedway is a National Historic Landmark and the world's largest sports venue by capacity, with 235,000 permanent seats. Since 1911, the  rectangular oval has hosted the Indianapolis 500, an open-wheel automobile race held annually on Memorial Day weekend. Considered part of the Triple Crown of Motorsport, the Indianapolis 500 is the world's largest single-day sporting event. The track's combined road course also hosts the Grand Prix of Indianapolis and NASCAR's Verizon 200 at the Brickyard and Pennzoil 150.

Completed in 1960, Lucas Oil Indianapolis Raceway Park (in nearby Brownsburg) contains a  road course, a  dragstrip, and a  oval short track. Each Labor Day weekend, the facility hosts the National Hot Rod Association (NHRA) U.S. Nationals, the largest and most prestigious drag racing event in the world.

Government and politics

Indianapolis—officially the Consolidated City of Indianapolis and Marion County—has a consolidated city-county form of government, a status it has held since 1970 under Indiana Code's Unigov provision. Many functions of the city and county governments are consolidated, though some remain separate. The city has a strong mayor–council form of government overseeing six administrative departments. Marion County also contains some 60 taxing units, nine separate civil township governments, and seven special-purpose municipal corporations.

The executive branch is headed by an elected mayor, who serves as the chief executive of both the city and county. Joe Hogsett is the 49th and current mayor of Indianapolis. Indianapolis City-County Council is the legislative body and consists of 25 members, all of whom represent geographic districts. The mayor and council members are elected to unlimited four-year terms. The judiciary consists of a circuit court and superior court with four divisions and 32 judges. Each of the county's nine civil townships elects its own township trustee, three-member board, assessor, and a constable and small claims court judge, all of whom serve four-year terms.

Since its move from Corydon in 1825, Indianapolis has served as the capital and seat of Indiana's state government. The Indiana Statehouse houses the executive, legislative, and judicial branches of state government, including the office of the Governor of Indiana, the Indiana General Assembly, and the Indiana Supreme Court. Most state departments and agencies are based in the neighboring Indiana Government Center complex.

In the Indiana House of Representatives, Indianapolis is split between 16 districts. In the Indiana Senate, the city is split between nine districts. Indianapolis is split between two of Indiana's nine congressional districts: Indiana's 7th congressional district, represented by André Carson, and Indiana's 5th congressional district, represented by Victoria Spartz.

The Birch Bayh Federal Building and United States Courthouse houses the United States District Court for the Southern District of Indiana. Most federal field offices are located in the Minton-Capehart Federal Building. The Defense Finance and Accounting Service, an agency of the U.S. Department of Defense, is headquartered in neighboring Lawrence.

Politics
Until fairly recently, Indianapolis was considered one of the most conservative major cities in the U.S. According to 2014 research published in the American Political Science Review, the city's policy preferences are less conservative than the national mean when compared with other large U.S. cities. While Indianapolis as a whole leans Democratic, the southern third of the city, consisting of Decatur, Perry, and Franklin townships, trends Republican.

Republicans held the mayor's office for 32 years (1967–1999), and controlled the City-County Council from its inception in 1970 to 2003. In the 2000 United States presidential election, Marion County voters narrowly selected George W. Bush over Al Gore by a margin of 1.3%, but voted in favor of John Kerry by a margin of 1.9% in the 2004 United States presidential election. Presidential election results have increasingly favored Democrats, with Marion County voters selecting Joe Biden over Donald Trump in the 2020 United States presidential election, 63.3–34.3%. Incumbent mayor Democrat Joe Hogsett faced Republican State Senator Jim Merritt and Libertarian Doug McNaughton in the 2019 Indianapolis mayoral election. Hogsett was elected to a second term, with 72% of the vote. The 2019 City-County Council elections expanded Democratic control of the council, flipping six seats to hold a 20–5 supermajority over Republicans.

Human resources

Public health

Healthcare in Indianapolis is provided by more than 20 hospitals, most belonging to the private, non-profit healthcare systems of Ascension St. Vincent Health, Community Health Network, and Indiana University Health. Several are teaching hospitals affiliated with the Indiana University School of Medicine or Marian University College of Osteopathic Medicine.

Health and Hospital Corporation of Marion County, a municipal corporation, was formed in 1951 to manage the city's public health facilities and programs, including the Marion County Public Health Department, Indianapolis Emergency Medical Services, and Eskenazi Health. Eskenazi Health operates 12 primary care centers across the city, including its flagship Sidney & Lois Eskenazi Hospital. Established in 1932, the Veterans Health Administration's Richard L. Roudebush VA Medical Center serves nearly 70,000 veterans annually. The NeuroDiagnostic Institute, a 159-bed psychiatric hospital overseen by the Indiana Family and Social Services Administration, opened in 2019.

Indiana University Health's Methodist Hospital, University Hospital, and Riley Hospital for Children are affiliated with the Indiana University School of Medicine, the largest medical school by enrollment in the U.S. Riley Hospital for Children is among the nation's foremost pediatric health centers, recognized in all ten specialties by U.S. News & World Report. The 430-bed facility is Indiana's only Pediatric Level I Trauma Center. In 2020, IU Health detailed plans to consolidate and replace Methodist and University hospitals with a new $1.6 billion academic medical center, to open in 2026.

Other major private, non-profit hospitals based in the city include Ascension St. Vincent Hospital Indianapolis, Community Hospital East, Community Hospital North, and Franciscan Health Indianapolis.

Public safety

Police and law enforcement

Indianapolis Metropolitan Police Department (IMPD) is the primary law enforcement agency for the city of Indianapolis. IMPD's jurisdiction covers Marion County, excluding the municipalities of Beech Grove, Lawrence, Southport, Speedway, and jurisdiction of the Indianapolis Airport Authority Police Department. IMPD was established in 2007 through a merger between the Indianapolis Police Department and the Marion County Sheriff's Office Law Enforcement Division. In 2020, IMPD had 1,700 sworn police personnel and 250 civilian employees across six districts. In 2022, the Community Justice Campus opened, housing the Marion County Sheriff's Office, a new courthouse, jail, and mental health and substance abuse clinic.

Until 2019, annual criminal homicide numbers had grown each year since 2011, reaching record highs from 2015 to 2018. With 144 criminal homicides, 2015 surpassed 1998 as the year with the most murder investigations in the city. With 159 criminal homicides, 2018 stands as the most violent year on record in the city. FBI data showed a 7 percent increase in violent crimes committed in Indianapolis, outpacing the rest of the state and country. Law enforcement has blamed increased violence on a combination of root causes, including poverty, substance abuse, and mental illness.

Firefighting and emergency medical services
IFD provides mutual aid to the excluded municipalities of Beech Grove, Lawrence, and Speedway, as well as Decatur, Pike, and Wayne townships which have retained their own fire departments. The fire district comprises seven geographic battalions with 43 fire stations. Some 1,200 firefighters respond to more than 161,000 incidents annually. IFD directs operations for Indiana Task-Force One (IN-TF1), one of 28 FEMA Urban Search and Rescue Task Force teams in the U.S.

Indianapolis Emergency Medical Services (IEMS) is the largest provider of pre-hospital medical care in Indiana and responds to 120,000 emergency dispatch calls annually. Similar to IFD, the agency's coverage area excludes Decatur, Pike, and Wayne townships, and the town of Speedway.

Public library system
Founded in 1873, the Indianapolis Public Library consists of the Central Library and 24 branches throughout Marion County. Central Library houses special collections, such as the Center for Black Literature & Culture, the Chris Gonzalez Collection, and the Nina Mason Pulliam Indianapolis Special Collections Room. In 2021, the public library system circulated 7.1 million items and hosted more than 2,500 programs for its 282,000 cardholders.

Education

Primary and secondary education
Marion County contains eleven K–12 public school districts, nine of which serve Indianapolis residents:
Franklin Township Community School Corporation
Indianapolis Public Schools (IPS)
Metropolitan School District of Decatur Township
Metropolitan School District of Lawrence Township
Metropolitan School District of Pike Township
Metropolitan School District of Warren Township
Metropolitan School District of Washington Township
Metropolitan School District of Wayne Township
Perry Township Schools

IPS is the largest district in the city with an annual enrollment of 23,000 students attending 60 schools. In 2015, IPS began contracting with charter organizations and nonprofit school managers to operate failing district schools as innovation schools. About 37% of IPS students are enrolled in 20 innovation schools, which are run independently but accountable to the Board of School Commissioners, with the remaining 63% of students attending 39 neighborhood or magnet schools. About 18,000 students are enrolled in tuition-free Mayor-Sponsored Charter Schools (MSCS), as authorized by the Indianapolis Mayor's Office of Education Innovation and Indianapolis Charter School Board.

Two state-supported residential schools located in the city are the Indiana School for the Blind and Visually Impaired and Indiana School for the Deaf. According to the Indiana Department of Education, about 75 private, parochial, and independent charter schools operate throughout Marion County. Roman Catholic and Christian parochial primary and secondary schools are most prevalent.

Higher education

Indianapolis' higher education landscape is dominated by Indiana University–Purdue University Indianapolis (IUPUI), a public university formed in 1969 after the branch campuses of Indiana University and Purdue University merged. IUPUI is classified as an urban research university, enrolling 30,000 students in 450 undergraduate, graduate, and professional programs offered by 17 schools. Notable schools include the Herron School of Art and Design, Kelley School of Business, O'Neill School of Public and Environmental Affairs, Robert H. McKinney School of Law, and the Indiana University School of Medicine, among the largest medical schools in the U.S.

Indiana's statewide community college system, Ivy Tech, enrolls some 21,000 full-time students at two full-service campuses, one learning site, and the Automotive Technology Center in the Indianapolis service area. Other public institutions with satellite campuses in the city include Ball State University's R. Wayne Estopinal College of Architecture and Planning, Purdue Polytechnic Institute, and Vincennes University.

Two secular private universities are based in Indianapolis. Founded in 1855, Butler University serves an enrollment of about 5,000 from its Butler–Tarkington campus. Martin University, Indiana's only Predominantly Black Institution, was founded in 1977 and is located in the Martindale–Brightwood neighborhood. Indiana Tech maintains a branch campus in the city. Two seminaries are based in the city: Bishop Simon Bruté College Seminary and Christian Theological Seminary. Three religiously affiliated universities based in the city are Indiana Bible College, University of Indianapolis, and Marian University. Indiana Wesleyan University operates a satellite campus in Indianapolis.

More than 40 collegiate fraternities and sororities are headquartered in the Indianapolis metropolitan area, the largest concentration in North America.

Media

Indianapolis is served by various print media. Founded in 1903, The Indianapolis Star is the city's daily morning newspaper. The Star is owned by Gannett Company, with a daily circulation of 127,064. The Indianapolis News was the city's daily evening newspaper and oldest print media, published from 1869 to 1999. Notable weeklies include NUVO, an alternative weekly newspaper, the Indianapolis Recorder, a weekly newspaper serving the local African American community, the Indianapolis Business Journal, reporting on local real estate news, and the Southside Times. Indianapolis Monthly is the city's monthly lifestyle publication.

Broadcast television network affiliates include WTTV 4 (CBS), WRTV 6 (ABC), WISH-TV 8 (The CW), WTHR-TV 13 (NBC), WDNI-CD 19 (Telemundo), WFYI-TV 20 (PBS), WNDY-TV 23 (MyNetworkTV), WUDZ-LD 28 (Buzzr), WSDI-LD 30 (Ve Plus TV), WHMB-TV 40 (Family), WCLJ-TV 42 (Bounce TV), WALV-CD 46 (MeTV), WBXI-CD 47 (Start TV), WXIN-TV 59 (Fox), WIPX-TV 63 (Ion) and WDTI 69 (Daystar). In 2019, the Indianapolis metropolitan area was the 25th largest television market in the U.S.

The majority of commercial radio stations in the city are owned by Cumulus Media, iHeartMedia, and Urban One. Popular nationally syndicated radio program The Bob & Tom Show has been based at Indianapolis radio station WFBQ since 1983. In 2019, the Indianapolis metropolitan area was the 39th largest radio market in the U.S.

Infrastructure

Transportation

Private ridesharing companies Lyft and Uber as well as taxicabs operate in the city. Launched in 2018, electric scooter-sharing systems operating in Indianapolis include Bird, Lime, and Veo.

Absent a comprehensive regional public transit system in combination with urban sprawl, Indianapolis residents drive more vehicle miles per capita than any other U.S. city. According to the 2016 American Community Survey, 83.7% of working residents in the city commuted by driving alone, 8.4% carpooled, 1.5% used public transportation, and 1.8% walked. About 1.5% used all other forms of transportation, including taxicab, motorcycle, and bicycle. About 3.1% of working city residents worked at home. In 2015, 10.5 percent of Indianapolis households lacked a car, which decreased to 8.7 percent in 2016, the same as the national average in that year. Indianapolis averaged 1.63 cars per household in 2016, compared to a national average of 1.8.

Streets and highways

Four primary Interstate Highways intersect the city: Interstate 65, Interstate 69, Interstate 70, and Interstate 74. The metropolitan area also has two auxiliary Interstate Highways: a beltway (Interstate 465) and connector (Interstate 865). A $3 billion expansion project to extend Interstate 69 from Evansville to Indianapolis is in progress. The Indiana Department of Transportation manages all Interstates, U.S. Highways, and Indiana State Roads within the city.

Walking and bicycling
Reliance on driving has impacted the city's walkability, with Walk Score ranking Indianapolis as one of the least walkable large cities in the U.S. However, city officials have increased investments in bicycle and pedestrian infrastructure in recent years. About  of trails and greenways form the core of the city's active transportation network, connecting into  of on-street bike lanes. Trails and greenways include the Fall Creek Greenway, Pleasant Run Greenway, and Monon Trail. The Monon is notable as a rail trail and part of the United States Bicycle Route System. The privately managed Indianapolis Cultural Trail provides  of separated bike and pedestrian corridors and operates Indiana Pacers Bikeshare, the city's bicycle-sharing system, which consists of 525 bicycles at 50 stations. Indianapolis is designated a "Bronze Level" Bicycle Friendly Community by the League of American Bicyclists.

Airports

IND is the busiest airport in the state, serving more than 9.5 million passengers in 2019. Completed in 2008, the Colonel H. Weir Cook Terminal contains two concourses and 40 gates, connecting to 51 nonstop domestic and international destinations and averaging 145 daily departures. As home to the second largest FedEx Express hub in the world, IND ranks among the ten busiest U.S. airports in terms of air cargo throughput.

Indianapolis Airport Authority, a municipal corporation, oversees operations at five additional airports in the region, two of which are located in the city: Eagle Creek Airpark (FAA LID:EYE), a relief airport for IND, and the Indianapolis Downtown Heliport (IATA: 8A4).

Public transport

The Indianapolis Public Transportation Corporation, doing business as IndyGo, operates the city's public bus system serving 9.2 million annual passenger trips in 2019. IndyGo's Julia M. Carson Transit Center opened in 2016 as the downtown hub for 27 of its 31 bus routes. In 2017, City-County Council approved a voter referendum increasing Marion County's income tax to help fund IndyGo's first major system expansion since its 1975 founding. Local taxes and federal grants will fund systemwide improvements, including the creation of three bus rapid transit lines, battery electric buses, sidewalks, bus shelters, extended hours and weekend schedules. Of the three bus rapid transit projects, the Red Line began service on September 1, 2019 and construction began on the Purple Line on February 25, 2022. Groundbreaking on the Blue Line is anticipated in 2024.

The Central Indiana Regional Transportation Authority (CIRTA) is a quasi-governmental agency that organizes regional car and vanpools and operates three public workforce connectors from Indianapolis to employment centers in Plainfield and Whitestown.

Intercity bus service to Indianapolis is provided by Barons Bus Lines, Burlington Trailways, FlixBus, Greyhound Lines, and Miller Transportation, among other private carriers.

Rail
Amtrak, the national passenger rail system, provides inter-city rail service to Indianapolis via Union Station, serving about 30,000 passengers in 2015. The Cardinal makes three weekly trips between New York City and Chicago. Amtrak's Beech Grove Shops, in the enclave of Beech Grove, serve as its primary heavy maintenance and overhaul facility, while the Indianapolis Distribution Center is the company's largest material and supply terminal.

About  of freight rail lines converge in the city, including one Class I railroad (CSX Transportation), one Class II railroad (Indiana Rail Road Company), and two shortline railroads (Indiana Southern Railroad and Louisville and Indiana Railroad). Indianapolis is a hub for CSX Transportation, home to its division headquarters, an intermodal terminal, and classification yard in the suburb of Avon.

Utilities

AES Indiana generates 3,000 megawatts of electricity for more than 500,000 Indianapolis area customers. Citizens Energy Group supplies about 400,000 Indianapolis area customers with natural gas, water, and wastewater treatment services. The company's thermal division operates the Perry K. Generating Station, producing and distributing steam for heating and cooling to about 160 customers in downtown Indianapolis.

The city's water is supplied through four surface water treatment plants, drawing from the White River, Fall Creek, and Eagle Creek Reservoir; and five pumping stations, providing water supply from groundwater aquifers. Additional water supply is ensured by four reservoirs in the region, including Citizens, Eagle Creek, Geist, and Morse.

Eleven solid waste districts are managed by one of three garbage collection providers: the city's Department of Public Works Solid Waste Division, Republic Services, and Waste Management. Residential curbside recycling is a subscription service provided by Republic Services and Ray's Trash Service. Recycling drop-off sites located throughout the city are provided free of charge by the Department of Public Works Solid Waste Division. Covanta Energy operates a waste-to-energy plant in the city, processing solid waste for steam production.

International relations

Sister cities

Indianapolis has ten sister cities and one former sister city. The Indianapolis Sister Cities International program was founded to promote the international exchange of commerce, culture, diplomacy, and education in accordance with Sister Cities International. Listed in the order each agreement was first established, they are:

  Taipei, Taiwan (1978) 
  Cologne, Germany (1988)
  Monza, Italy (1993)
  Scarborough, Canada (1996–1998; dissolved)
  Piran, Slovenia (2001)
  Hangzhou, China (2008)
  Campinas, Brazil (2009)
  Northamptonshire, United Kingdom (2009)
  Hyderabad, India (2010)
  Onitsha, Nigeria (2017)
  Santiago de Querétaro, Mexico (2023)

Consulates
Ten foreign consulates are based in Indianapolis, serving Denmark, France, Germany, Italy, Japan, Mexico, Portugal, Romania, Slovakia, and Switzerland.

See also

 Eleven Park
 Indianapolis Catacombs
 List of people from Indianapolis
 USS Indianapolis, 4 ships

Notes

References

Further reading

External links

 
 Indianapolis Chamber of Commerce
 Digital Indy from the Indianapolis Public Library Digital Collections
 Indianapolis Sanborn Map and Baist Atlas Collection from the University Library at IUPUI

 
1821 establishments in Indiana
Articles containing video clips
Cities in Indiana
Cities in Marion County, Indiana
Consolidated city-counties
County seats in Indiana
 
National Road
Planned capitals
Planned cities in the United States
Populated places established in 1821